Princess Ashraf al-Muluk (1883–1955), titled Fakhr-ol-Dowleh (meaning pride of the state), was one of the most prominent daughters of Mozaffar ad-Din Shah of the Qajar dynasty, who had a reputably strong character, to the point that she was even willing and able to confront Reza Shah for her patrimony and right.

She married Prince Mohsen, Amin ol dowleh junior, whose father, Mirza Ali Khan, Amin ol dowleh senior, was a prominent Qajar prime minister, often condemned for acting indecisively towards foreign powers, specifically Britain.

She took control of her husband's huge wealth, together with that of her own inheritance from his father, and managed to make his family the most financially powerful in the country. Most of the district of Elahieh in Tehran belonged to her. She also introduced taxis for the first time in Tehran, white Fiats that slowly replaced old horse carriages during the 1950s.

Her son, Ali Amini, briefly became a Prime Minister of Iran under Mohammad Reza Shah, and after the Iranian Revolution of 1979 led an opposition movement against the Islamic republic in Paris.

See also
Fakhr al-Dawla Mosque
Mozaffar al-Din Shah Qajar
Ali Amini

References

External links
 Amini-Qajar (Kajar), Shajarehnaameh Project

Qajar princesses
1883 births
1955 deaths
20th-century Iranian women